Paolucci, also spelled Paulucci, and historically scarcely as Paoluzzi, Pauluzzi and Paluzzi is an Italian surname deriving from the given name Paolo (Paulus). It may refer to:

Amilcare Paulucci (1773–1845), Italian admiral 
Adriano Paolucci (b. 1979), Italian male volleyball player
Andrea Paolucci (b. 1986), Italian footballer.
Anne Paolucci (1926-2012), Italian-American writer, scholar, and educator
Antonio Paolucci (b. 1939), Italian art historian and curator
Fabrizio Paolucci (bishop), (1565–1625), Roman Catholic prelate who served as Bishop of Città della Pieve
Fabrizio Paolucci (1651–1726), Catholic cardinal
Fabrizio Paolucci (1726–1810)
Federico Paulucci (b. 1990), Argentinian footballer
Gianfranco Paolucci (b. 1934), Italian fencer
Gustavo Paolucci (born 1954), Argentine field hockey player
Jeno Paulucci (1918-2011), American businessman and entrepreneur
Lorenzo Paolucci (born 1996), Italian football player
Loris Paoluzzi (b. 1974), Italian retired male hammer thrower
Luciana Paluzzi (b. 1937), Italian actress
Marianna Paulucci (1835–1919), Italian naturalist
Mario Paolucci (1941-2008), Argentinian film actor
Michele Paolucci (b. 1986), Italian footballer
Pauluccio Paulucci-Alberoni (fl. 1670-1676), Catholic cardinal and coadjutor to Pope Clement X
Philip Osipovich Paulucci (1779–1849), Italian marquis, served in the Russian Army as adjutant general
Roland Paolucci (b. 1947), retired Swiss footballer 

Italian-language surnames
Patronymic surnames
Surnames from given names